Dipyrena is a genus of flowering plants belonging to the family Verbenaceae.

Its native range is southern South America.

Species:

Dipyrena glaberrima 
Dipyrena spartioides

References

Verbenaceae
Verbenaceae genera